"Yesterday's News" is a song by alternative country band Whiskeytown, co-written by Ryan Adams and Phil Wandscher.  It first appeared on Whiskeytown's Strangers Almanac album, and was released in 1998 as a CD single.

An earlier version of the song - recorded during the band's "Baseball Park" sessions - was released on the 1998 reissue of the band's first album Faithless Street.  Ryan Adams calls this "the definitive version. It sounds younger and freer than the one on Strangers Almanac, a little bit faster and louder. That was our Big Star phase. I played through a Vox amp at [producer] Chris Stamey’s request. Phil put a space-echo on the solo, and he talks underneath me in the choruses. The singing is better on the original... I had just written the song when we recorded it with Chris [Stamey] for the Baseball Park Sessions. The person it was about was still fresh in my mind."

The lyrics of the song mention "The Comet", i.e., The Comet Lounge, a favorite Raleigh, NC, hangout for the band.  The bar has since closed.

Track listing

Personnel & Production Credits
 Ryan Adams —  acoustic & electric guitars, singing, banjo, piano, percussion
 Phil Wandscher —  electric guitar, singing, organ, percussion
 Caitlin Cary —  violin, singing
 Steven Terry —  drums, singing, percussion
 Jeff Rice —  bass guitar
 Produced, engineered, and mixed by Jim Scott

References

1998 singles
Whiskeytown songs
Songs written by Ryan Adams
Songs written by Phil Wandscher
1997 songs